Giacomo Gentili (born 3 July 1997) is an Italian rower. He is a world champion and an Olympic finalist. He competed at the 2020 Summer Olympics, in Quadruple sculls.

He participated at the 2018 World Rowing Championships where he became world champion in quad scull. The following year, he won bronze in the men's quad at the 2019 World Rowing Championships.

References

External links

1997 births
Living people
Italian male rowers
Sportspeople from Cremona
World Rowing Championships medalists for Italy
European Rowing Championships medalists
Rowers of Fiamme Gialle
Rowers at the 2020 Summer Olympics
Olympic rowers of Italy
21st-century Italian people